Major-General Sir Leopold Victor Swaine KCB CMG (15 December 1840 – 13 March 1931) was a British Army officer, military attaché at Berlin and Lord Wolseley's military secretary during the Anglo-Egyptian War.

Military career
Swaine's godfather was the King of Belgium. He joined the Rifle Brigade as an Ensign on 24 July 1859, rising to Lieutenant on 16 August 1864. He was later military attaché at Berlin and Lord Wolseley's military secretary during the Anglo-Egyptian War. He held the command of the North-Western military district (at Chester) from 1896 until May 1902, and retired from the army in December the same year.

Swaine died on 13 March 1931. He is buried in Brompton Cemetery, London. Two 1861 photographs by Camille Silvy are held by the National Portrait Gallery, London.

References

1840 births
1931 deaths
Burials at Brompton Cemetery
Rifle Brigade officers
Knights Commander of the Order of the Bath
Companions of the Order of St Michael and St George